The Antwerp Management School is the University of Antwerp's autonomous business school. It is located in the historical center of the city of Antwerp.

The school offers eight full-time master programs and more than sixty short or long-term executive programs on a variety of subjects. The majority of students at Antwerp Management School come from abroad, which reflects the global perspective of the school. Additionally, the school has strong ties with many Chinese institutions.

History
Antwerp Management School was established in 1959 as the "Instituut voor Postuniversitair Onderwijs (IPO)". In 2000, the school changed its name to Antwerp Management School and became an independent organization within the University of Antwerp. All postgraduate management programs and management master programs from the University of Antwerp were transferred to Antwerp Management School.

Accreditations

International accreditations

AACSB
The University of Antwerp is accredited by the Association to Advance Collegiate Schools of Business (AACSB) for its economic programs at the Faculty of Business and Economics and Antwerp Management School and was the first Belgian university to acquire this accreditation. With over 500 accredited members (about 60 outside of the US), AACSB is the oldest (1916).

AMBA
In 2015, Antwerp Management School obtained the AMBA accreditation for their Executive MBA in association with IBS.

Regional accreditation

NVAO
The Antwerp Management School master trainings have been accredited by the Dutch-Flemish Accreditation Organisation (NVAO) on the basis of the AACSB- accreditation. With this NVAO acknowledgment on the basis of an already acquired international accreditation, the University of Antwerp is a firstling among the Belgian universities.

Partner Institutions
 Gabelli School of Business, Fordham University, New York (Verenigde Staten)
 Essca, Ecole de Management, Angers, Paris (Frankrijk), Budapest (Hongarije), Shanghai (China)
 Design Consortium of Politecnico di Milano, Milaan (Italië)
 JMU, James Madison University, Virginia (Verenigde Staten)
 University of Fortaleza, Fortaleza (Brazilië)
 Alliance University, Bangalore (India)
 XIMB, Xavier Institute of Management, Bhubaneswar (India)
 Lingnan University College, Sun Yat-sen University, Guangzhou (China)
 Donghua University, Glorious Sun School of Business Management, Shanghai (China)
 Hebei University of Technology, Tianjin (China)
 School of Economics and Business Management at Chongqing University, Chongqing (China)
 Shanghai Finance University, SFU, Shanghai (China)
 SWUFE, Southwestern University of Finance and Economics, Chengdu (China)
 Xi’an University of Finance and Economics, Xi’an (China)
 Zhejiang Sci-Tech University, Zhejiang (China)
 Zhejiang University School of Economics, Hangzhou (China)
 HEC Ecole de Gestion de l’Université de Liège, Luik (België)
 Institute of Business Studies, IBS, Moskou (Rusland)
 Lingnan University College, Sun Yat-sen University, Guangzhou (China)
 China Executive Leadership Academy Pudong, CELAP, Pudong (China)
 Donghua University, Glorious Sun School of Business Management, Shanghai (China)
 Hebei University of Technology, Tianjin (China)
 School of Economics and Business Management at Chongqing University, Chongqing (China)
 SWUFE, Southwestern University of Finance and Economics, Chengdu (China)
 Xi’an University of Finance and Economics, Xi’an (China)
 Zhejiang Institute of Administration of China, Hangzhou (China)
 Zhejiang University School of Economics, Hangzhou (China)

Notable rankings

2019
Executive MBA ranking by the Financial Times
62nd worldwide
1st in Belgium
Masters in Management ranking by the Financial Times
37th worldwide
2nd in Belgium
European Business School ranking by the Financial Times
46th in Europe
2nd in Belgium

2018
Masters in Management ranking by the Financial Times
37th worldwide
2nd in Belgium
Master by the Financial Times
62nd worldwide
1st in Belgium

2018
Masters in Management ranking by the Financial Times
45th worldwide
2nd in Belgium

2017
Masters in Management ranking by the Financial Times
30th worldwide
1st in Belgium

2016
Masters in Management ranking by the Financial Times
29th worldwide
1st in Belgium

2015
Executive MBA ranking by the Financial Times
67th worldwide
1st in Belgium
Masters in Management ranking by Financial Times
34th worldwide
1st in Belgium
European Business School ranking by the Financial Times
45th in Europe
2nd in Belgium

2014
Executive MBA ranking by the Financial Times
59th worldwide
1st in Belgium
Masters in Management ranking by the Financial Times
34th worldwide
1st in Belgium
European Business School ranking by the Financial Times
42nd in Europe
2nd in Belgium

2013
Executive MBA ranking by the Financial Times
55th worldwide
1st in Belgium
European Business School ranking by the Financial Times
41st in Europe
2nd in Belgium

2012
Executive MBA ranking by the Financial Times
50th worldwide
1st in Belgium
European Business School ranking by the Financial Times
40th in Europe
2nd in Belgium

Location

The Antwerp Management School is located in the historical center of the city of Antwerp.

In the year 2000, after an award-winning renovation, a 15th-century mansion called ‘Het Brantijser’ became the new home of the Management School. The architect and principal have been awarded with the Europa Nostra Award for the combination of the historical foundations and the modern interpretation. Other university campuses are within walking distance.

In 2018, the Antwerp Management School moved to the Boogkeers, former OCMW building at the Mechelseplein.

Organisation & faculty members

General Council 
 Christian Leysen, Chairman 
 Steven De Haes, Dean since 1 September 2018

Formerly part of the General Council:
 Philippe Naert, Former Dean (2009-2012) and Former Dean of INSEAD
 Paul Matthyssens, Former Dean (2013-2018)

Faculty 

 Jamie Anderson
 Bart Cambré
 Wim Van Grembergen
 Erik Guldentops
 Jan Hoogervorst
 Herwig Mannaert
 Rudy Martens
 Hans Mulder
 Martin Op ’t Land
 Marc Vael
 Lou Van Beirendonck
 Robert Van Straelen
 Koen Vandenbempt
 Jan Vanthienen
 Jan Verelst

Notable alumni
 Jo Cornu, CEO of the National Railway Company of Belgium
 Bert De Graeve, Chief Executive Officer (CEO) and Chairman of Bekaert

References

External links
 
 University of Antwerp

University of Antwerp
Business schools in Belgium